Launched as MACIF - FRA 301 the yacht is an IMOCA 60 monohull sailing yacht, designed by Guillaume Verdier and VPLP and constructed by Green Marine in the United Kingdom and CDK Technologies in France.

Racing Results

Timeline

MACIF - FRA 301
The boat was commissioned for François GABART to compete in 2012–2013 Vendée Globe.

SMA
In 2015 the boat was put into partnership with Paul Meilhat and rebranded as SMA with the intention to compete in 2016-2017 Vendée Globe

Banque Populaire X
In 2019 the boat was purchased by Banque Populaire Sailing Team who had sold there race winning boat but decided to back French offshore sailor Clarisse Cremer in her attempt to complete the 2020-2021 Vendée Globe.

References 

2010s sailing yachts
Sailing yachts designed by VPLP
Sailboat types built in France
Vendée Globe boats
IMOCA 60